The bird family Casuariidae  has four surviving members: the three species of cassowary and the emu.

All living members of the family are very large flightless birds native to Australia-New Guinea.

Species
† Emuarius Boles, 1992 (emuwaries) (Late Oligocene – Late Miocene)
† E. gidju (Patterson & Rich 1987) Boles, 1992
† E. guljaruba Boles, 2001
Casuarius Brisson, 1760 (cassowary)
† C. lydekkeri Rothschild, 1911 (Pygmy cassowary)
 C. casuarius (Linnaeus, 1758)  (Southern cassowary)
 C. unappendiculatus Blyth, 1860  (Northern cassowary)
 C. bennetti Gould, 1857 (Dwarf Cassowary)
 C. b. westermanni (Sclater, 1874)  (Papuan dwarf cassowary)
 C. b. bennetti Gould, 1857 (Bennett's cassowary)
 Dromaius Vieillot, 1816 (emu)
 †D. arleyekweke Yates & Worthy 2019
 †D. ocypus Miller 1963
 D. novaehollandiae (Latham, 1790) (Emu)
 †D. n. diemenensis Le Souef, 1907 (Tasmanian emu)
 †D. n. minor Spencer, 1906 (King Island emu)
 †D. n. baudinianus Parker, SA, 1984 (Kangaroo Island emu)
 D. n. novaehollandiae (Latham, 1790) (Emu)

Systematics and evolution

The fossil record of casuariforms is interesting, but not very extensive.

Some Australian fossils initially believed to be from emus were recognized to represent a distinct genus, Emuarius,
which had a cassowary-like skull and femur and an emu-like lower leg and foot.

Footnotes

References
Boles, Walter E. (2001): A new emu (Dromaiinae) from the Late Oligocene Etadunna Formation. Emu 101: 317–321. HTML abstract
 
 
Folch, A. (1992). Family Casuariidae (Cassowaries). pp. 90– 97 in; del Hoyo, J., Elliott, A. & Sargatal, J. eds. Handbook of the Birds of the World, Vol 1, Ostrich to Ducks. Lynx Edicions, Barcelona.

External links

 
Bird families
Ratites
Flightless birds
Taxa named by Johann Jakob Kaup